An election was held on November 7, 2006 to elect all 100 members to Montana's House of Representatives. The election coincided with elections for other offices, including U.S. Senate, U.S. House of Representatives and State Senate. The primary election was held on June 6, 2006.

A net loss of one seat by the Democrats resulted in the Democrats winning 49 seats compared to 50 seats for the Republicans. The Republicans regained control of the House due to the Constitution Party member caucusing with the Republicans.

Results

Statewide
Statewide results of the 2006 Montana House of Representatives election:

District
Results of the 2006 Montana House of Representatives election by district:

References

House of Representatives
Montana House of Representatives
2006